The Arches may mean:
 The Arches (Glasgow), a former theatre, arts venue and nightclub in Glasgow
 The Arches (London nightclub), a nightclub in London
 The Arches (Sheffield nightclub), a nightclub in Sheffield
 The Arches is a location in the fictional borough of Walford, in the BBC soap opera EastEnders.
 The Arches Provincial Park, a public park on the western coastline of Newfoundland and Labrador, Canada
 A nickname for McDonald's, a fast food chain